Genuine Opposition (GO) was an electoral alliance in the Philippines that contested the 2007 Philippine general election. The alliance's members were in opposition to President Gloria Macapagal Arroyo. It was originally called the United Opposition (UNO), founded by Makati mayor Jejomar Binay in June 2005 to unite all politicians who wanted to impeach President Arroyo. UNO then reorganized itself and changed its name to Grand and Broad Coalition (GBC), with the UNO party under that coalition. On February 15, 2007, the group changed its name again to Genuine Opposition after a meeting with Senate President Manny Villar due to the defection of senators Edgardo Angara, Tessie Aquino-Oreta, and Tito Sotto to Arroyo's senatorial slate, TEAM Unity.

In the Senate election, GO won 7 of the 12 contested seats. They gained one more seat in 2011 as a result of an electoral protest, through which GO's Koko Pimentel replaced TEAM Unity's Migz Zubiri. However, GO failed to dominate the House of Representatives.

Coalition members
Mainstream party members:
 United Opposition (UNO)
 Liberal Party (LP-Drilon wing)
 Puwersa ng Masang Pilipino (PMP)
 PDP–Laban
 Nationalist People's Coalition (NPC-Escudero/Legarda wing)
 Nacionalista Party (NP)
 Kilusang Bagong Lipunan (KBL-Marcos wing)
 Aksyon Demokratiko (AD)

Background

The United Opposition Coalition was created by Makati Mayor Jejomar Binay In June 2005 to unite all politicians who wished to impeach Philippine President Gloria Macapagal Arroyo. The UNO started scouting candidates for the Senate as early as October 2006 to claim a large share of the Senate seats. In January 2007, UNO started short-listing its nominees after a large number of interested personalities wanted to join the opposition. The UNO changed its name on February 12, 2007, at the Club Filipino in San Juan, Metro Manila to "Grand and Broad Coalition" (GBC). On February 15, 2007, the group changed its name again to "Genuine Opposition" (GO) after a meeting with Senate President Manny Villar in his office in Las Piñas. GO became the opposition coalition with eight parties under its wing, including its predecessor, UNO. Though Senate President Manny Villar and Senate Majority Leader Francis Pangilinan are running under the Opposition, they remain independent candidates as in the 2001 election. On February 28, 2007, Genuine Opposition dropped Francis Pangilinan as its adopted candidate. After the elections, GO reverted to being the United Opposition, with Binay as head, but still maintaining the support of the other parties that comprised GO.

Slogan
The first slogan is "P L A N Co R E V O L T". P stands for Pimentel, L stands for Legarda, A stands for Alan, N stands for Noynoy, Co stands for Coseteng, R stands for Roco, E stands for Escudero, V stands for Villar, O stands for Osmeña, L stands for Lacson, and T stands for Trillanes.  The PLAN Co REVOLT partylist (literally, My plan is to revolt) means "Revolt against corruption and poverty". The second slogan is "Isang boto lang po laban sa nakaupo." (literally, One vote against the incumbent.).

GO senatorial slate

Campaign team

Campaign Manager: Senator Serge Osmeña  (PDP–Laban)
Deputy Campaign Manager: San Juan Mayor JV Ejercito (PMP)
Campaign Spokesman: Atty. Adel Tamano, former president of Pamantasan ng Lungsod ng Maynila

See also

 Koalisyon ng Nagkakaisang Pilipino (KNP) (Coalition of United Filipinos), the opposition's coalition in the 2004 Presidential elections.
 Puwersa ng Masa (Force of the Masses), the opposition's coalition in the 2001 midterm elections.
 Laban ng Makabayang Masang Pilipino (LAMMP) (Struggle of Patriotic Filipino Masses), the opposition's coalition in the 1998 Presidential elections.
 TEAM Unity, Genuine Opposition rival coalition last 2007 midterm elections.
 Team PNoy, Most Genuine Opposition candidates are reelected in 2013 midterm election.

External links
Genuine Opposition's Official Website

References

Defunct political party alliances in the Philippines